William Reid was a Scottish football player and manager; he managed Norwich City from 1961 to 1962.

Managerial career 
Norwich City

After he had guided St. Mirren to a Scottish League Cup final in 1956 and Scottish Cup victory in 1959, Reid was appointed as the manager of Norwich City on 14 December 1961. He led Norwich City to the 1962 League Cup with a final win against Rochdale, 4–0 on aggregate. This was Norwich City's first League Cup and first major trophy ever won. After only being in charge for 6 months Willie decided to leave the club and return home to his family in Troon, Scotland. Although Willie enjoyed a successful stint with Norwich City he was too homesick for Scotland to stay and decided against moving his family down.

References 

Scottish football managers
Norwich City F.C. managers
St Mirren F.C. managers
1975 deaths
People from Neilston
Year of birth missing
Cowdenbeath F.C. players
Ashfield F.C. players
St Mirren F.C. players
Airdrieonians F.C. (1878) wartime guest players
Falkirk F.C. wartime guest players
Dumbarton F.C. wartime guest players
English Football League managers
Scottish Football League players
Scottish Football League managers
Scottish Junior Football Association players
Association football forwards
Scottish footballers
Sportspeople from East Renfrewshire